Ahmad Izham Omar is the Executive Director of Content & Creative of Disney+ for Southeast Asia.

He was the former chief executive office of Primeworks Studios. He was also formerly the chief executive officer of Media Prima Television Network (MPTN), which included all four free-to-air television channels owned by the Malaysian media group including, TV3, ntv7, 8TV, and TV9.

Izham's other notable stints have included heading the Media Prima Radio Networks (MPRN) with popular Malaysian radio stations including Hot FM, Kool FM, Fly FM and One FM in its stable.

A multi award-winning music producer, arranger, songwriter and musician, Izham's musical career started with legendary Positive Tone record label in 1994, producing progressive music that captured the imagination of Malaysia. He first became well known by being associated the vocal group called Innuendo which he popularized.

His other feats also include launching a world-class video portal called Tonton, which was heralded as a breakthrough by the global industry, being awarded the Most Promising Entrepreneur Award by Enterprise Asia, being accepted as a delegate in the prestigious Asia Society 21 Young Leader's Summit, and recognised with a Lifetime Achievement Award by VIMA (Voice of Independent Music Awards) for his contribution to music.

Izham is also the Chairman of the Communications and Multimedia Content Forum of Malaysia (CMCF) besides being a Trustee of Yayasan 1Malaysia. He has a monthly column in the New Straits Times called “For The Record” where he talks about all things music and creativity.

References

External links
 Sourced from Media Prima Berhad's webpage

Living people
Malaysian chief executives
Malaysian people of Malay descent
Malaysian Muslims
People from Selangor
Year of birth missing (living people)